The following is a list of academicians, both past and present, who are widely renowned for their groundbreaking contributions to the field of social psychology.

A
 Dominic Abrams
 Lauren Alloy
 Icek Ajzen
 Floyd Allport
 Gordon Allport
 Irwin Altman
Craig A. Anderson
 Norman H. Anderson
 Michael Argyle
 Elliot Aronson
 Solomon Asch
 Berit Ås

B
 Anna Costanza Baldry
 Mahzarin Banaji
 Albert Bandura - Canadian psychologist known for social learning theory (or social cognitive theory) and self efficacy
 John Bargh - known for having several priming experiments that failed subsequent attempts at direct replication
 Robert A. Baron
 Daniel Batson
 Martin Bauer
 Roy Baumeister
 Howard Becker
 Daryl Bem - proposed self-perception theory of attitude change, competitor to Leon Festinger's cognitive dissonance theory
 Ellen S. Berscheid
 Michael Billig
 Hart Blanton
 Marilynn Brewer
 Roger Brown
 Brad Bushman

C
 John Cacioppo
 Donald T. Campbell
 Merrill Carlsmith
 Nicholas Christenfeld
 Robert Cialdini - known for his research on influence processes
 Ronald L. Cohen
 Peter T. Coleman
 Terri Conley
 Stuart W. Cook
 Charles Horton Cooley
 Nora Cortiñas
 William Crano

D
 James M. Dabbs, Jr.
 John M. Darley
 Edward L. Deci - co-founder of Self-Determination Theory
 Morton Deutsch
 Ed Diener
 Carol Dweck

E
 Phoebe C. Ellsworth
 Jennifer Eberhardt

F
 Steven Fein
 Leon Festinger - originator of cognitive dissonance theory and social comparison theory
 Susan Fiske
 Erich Fromm

G
 Stanley O. Gaines
 Laszlo Garai - developed theory of social identity as mediating factor
 George Gaskell
 Bertram Gawronski
 Kenneth Gergen
 Daniel Gilbert
 Thomas Gilovich - psychologist and key figure in behavioral economics
 Erving Goffman
 Mirta González Suárez
 John Gottman - researcher known for his work in identifying relationship behaviors that predict relationships' future  quality and stability
 Anthony Greenwald - creator of the Implicit Association Test

H
 Jonathan Haidt
 Rom Harré
 Elaine Hatfield
 Fritz Heider
 Miles Hewstone
 E. Tory Higgins - Motivation, regulatory focus theory, regulatory engagement theory, regulatory mode
 Hilde Himmelweit
 Geert Hofstede
 Michael Hogg - social identity theory
 Carl Hovland

I
 Michael Inzlicht

J
 Irving Janis - known for his landmark research on the concept of "groupthink"
 Edward E. Jones - co-authored the first paper on what was later called fundamental attribution error; known for researching actor-observer bias
 Sandra Jovchelovitch
 Charles Hubbard Judd

K
 Daniel Kahneman
 Saul Kassin
 Harold Kelley
 George Kelly
 Herbert Kelman
 Arie Kruglanski
 Ziva Kunda

L
 Michael C. LaFerney - utilizing Social Psychology principles in Nursing practice http://laferney.socialpsychology.org//https://nurse.org/articles/red-sox-nurse-night-2019/
 Bibb Latané - initiated research on bystander intervention in emergencies (with John Darley), social loafing (with Kip Williams), and Dynamic Social Impact Theory (with Andrzej Nowak)
 Gustave Le Bon
 Mark Lepper
 Becca Levy
 Kurt Lewin - often called "the father of social psychology"; one of the first researchers to study group dynamics and organizational development

M
 Ivana Markova
 Hazel Rose Markus
 Everett Dean Martin
 Francis T. McAndrew
 David McClelland
 Joseph E. McGrath - group dynamics researcher
 George Herbert Mead - American philosopher (pragmatist), sociologist, and psychologist; a founder of social psychology; founder of symbolic interactionism
 Stanley Milgram - performed famous experiment that demonstrated people's excessive willingness to obey authority figures
 Walter Mischel - among the first to promote a situationist view of personality
 Abraham Moles - one of the first to establish and analyze links between aesthetics and information theory
 Serge Moscovici
 Gordon Moskowitz
 Eleanor Maccoby

N
 David Nadler
 Theodore Newcomb
 Richard Nisbett
 Mary Louise Northway
 Andrzej Nowak

O
Richard Ofshe
Tom Ostrom

P
 Ian Parker
 James W. Pennebaker
 Richard E. Petty
 Anthony Pratkanis
 Tom Pyszczynski
  Ivan Pavlov

R
 Wilhelm Reich - mass psychology
 Steve Reicher
 Harry Reis
 Robert Rosenthal - Pygmalion effect
 Lee Ross - performed pioneering research on the fundamental attribution error
 Zick Rubin - author of the first empirical measurement of love
 Richard M. Ryan - co-founder of Self-Determination Theory

S
 Stanley Schachter
 Gunter Schmidt
 Norbert Schwarz - known for his work on metacognitive experiences and survey methodology
 Martin Seligman
 Claire Selltiz
 Muzafer Sherif
 Boris Sidis - groundbreaking work on the psychology of suggestion, dissociative identity disorder, psychopathology, and genius
 Volkmar Sigusch
 Linda Skitka
 Diederik Stapel - founder of the Tilburg Institute for Behavioral Economics Research, later suspended from Tilburg University for fabricating and manipulating data
 Claude Steele - known for his groundbreaking work on stereotype threat and for introducing self-affirmation theory
 William Swann - known for developing self-verification theory

T
 Henri Tajfel
 Jeffrey S. Tanaka
 Gabriel Tarde
 Carol Tavris
 Shelley Taylor
 John Thibaut - first editor of JESP, known for Interdependence Theory from "The Social Psychology of Groups"
 Norman Triplett - widely credited with the first published study in the field of social psychology, with his work on social facilitation
 Bruce Tuckman
 John C. Turner
 Amos Tversky

W
 Daniel Wegner
 Karl Weick
 Kipling Williams
 Glenn D Wilson
 Timothy Wilson
 Robert S. Wyer - social cognition and information processing
 Wendy Wood

Z
 Robert Zajonc - first academic to study the mere exposure effect
 Mark Zanna
 Philip Zimbardo - known for conducting the Stanford prison experiment

See also
List of psychologists
List of sociologists

References

Social psychologists
Social psychologists
List